The China Current is a storytelling platform —news, articles, interviews, videos, and podcasts — for global stories on health, nature, innovation, and culture. This platform is supported by China-U.S. Exchange Foundation.

The website states that "As of January 2020, The China Current is also presenting The Novel Outbreak, a special series on the COVID-19 pandemic, as part of its commitment to sharing verified and trusted information during the global crisis."

The platform is hosted by James Chau, a former news anchor and current GoodWill Ambassador for World Health Organization. Through The China Current, James Chau has interviewed WHO Director-General Tedros Adhanom Ghebreyesus, Prime Minister of Norway Erna Solberg, UNAIDS Executive Director Winnie Byanyima, Columbia University Professor Jeffrey Sachs, Former Prime Minister of New Zealand Helen Clark, and many others.

References

2013 establishments in China
News agencies based in China